Crowan, Sithney and Wendron is an electoral division of Cornwall in the United Kingdom which returns one member to sit on Cornwall Council. It was created at the 2021 local elections, being formed from the former divisions of Crowan and Wendron and Breage, Germoe and Sithney. The current councillor is Loveday Jenkin, a Mebyon Kernow member.

Extent
Crowan, Sithney and Wendron represents the villages of Praze-an-Beeble, Crowan, Burras, Carnkie, Rame, Porkellis, Wendron, Trewennack, Sithney, Nancegollan and Townshend, and the hamlets of Polmarth, Penmarth, Halwin, Trenear, Trevenen Bal, Lowertown-by-Helston, Coverack Bridges, Sithney Green and Crowntown, as well as most of the village of Leedstown (some of the northern outskirts of which are covered by the Gwinear-Gwithian and Hayle East division). It also covers the Helston Railway.

Election results

2021 election

Notes

References

Electoral divisions of Cornwall Council